Testarossa is a winery and tasting room in Los Gatos, California. Testarossa makes multiple varietals and is known primarily for making Chardonnay and Pinot Noir wines.

History 
Testarossa was started by Rob and Diana Jensen in 1993. The name Testarossa is derived from Italian and means "red head," a reference to the nickname Rob Jensen was given when studying abroad in Italy in college while attending Santa Clara University. In 1997, the winery moved into the historic Sacred Heart Novitiate facility in Los Gatos and expanded to the entire winemaking facility in 2003. The production of altar wine during Prohibition means the Novitiate is the fourth-oldest continuously operating winery in California. Ed Kurtzman was the label's winemaker until Bill Brosseau took over in 2000.

Wine Profiles

Chardonnay 
For the 2013 vintage, Testarossa produced 12 Chardonnay wines: Chalone, Santa Lucia Highlands, Cuvee Los Gatos, Diana's Chardonnay, Dos Rubios, Fogstone, La Rinconada, Lone Oak, Rincon, Rosella's, Sierra Madre, and Soberanes. Many of them received ratings of 90 or higher from the Wine Enthusiast Magazine. The vintage had a high yield despite the drought conditions in California, producing grapes at a similar level to 2012.

Pinot Noir 
For the 2013 vintage, Testarossa produced 19 Pinot Noir wines: Russian River Valley, Santa Lucia Highlands, Cuvee Los Gatos, Cuvee Niclaire, Brosseau, Doctor's, Dos Rubios, Fogstone, Graham Family, Guidotti, La Encantada, La Rinconada, Pisoni, Rincon, Rosella's, Sanford & Benedict, Sierra Madre, Soberanes, and Tondre Grapefield.

Other Varietals 
For the 2013 vintage, Testarossa also produced a Pinot Noir Rose, a Syrah, and a Late Harvest Syrah.

Vineyard Partners 
Testarossa has vineyard partners from multiple American Viticultural Areas (AVAs) in California; primarily, the Russian River Valley AVA, Chalone AVA, Santa Lucia Highlands AVA, Arroyo Grande Valley AVA, Santa Maria Valley AVA, and the Sta. Rita Hills AVA.

News, Scores and Reviews 
Testarossa is among the top 10 rated wineries in the San Jose area and remain one of the oldest operating ones as well. The Silicon Valley Business Journal noted the winery's location as one of the reasons it's been so successful with events, noting its close proximity to Apple's Cupertino location and Cisco's San Jose location.

Dave Meniketti of the musical group Y&T recently started producing his own label, Meniketti Wines, with Testarossa and together have made a Chardonnay and Pinot Noir released in summer of 2015.

Testarossa wines have been reviewed by the Wine Enthusiast, Wine Spectator, and Robert Parker. The Wine Enthusiast named Testarossa one of the vital Pinot Noir producers of the Santa Lucia Highlands region and have given them many 90-point scores over the course of the winery's history. Both the Wine Spectator and Robert Parker have given scores of 90 or higher to multiple of Testarossa's wines.

Sacred Heart Novitiate 
The facility Testarossa was originally created by Jesuits from Santa Clara College. The Sacred Heart Novitiate produced wine from 1888 to 1986, most notable creating a Black Muscat dessert wine that won gold medals multiple times at the California State Fair. It primarily served as a training center for Jesuit novices who would then later go to Santa Clara College (now Santa Clara University).The Novitiates purchased 40 acres of ranch land from Harvey Wilcox in 1886 and used it to grow wine as well as a variety of different fruits and vegetables. Currently, the Novitiate primarily serves as a retirement center for Jesuits and the Sacred Heart Jesuit Retirement Center houses over 75 Jesuits.

References 

Wineries in California
California wine
Los Gatos, California
Food and drink in the San Francisco Bay Area